This is a list of notable zoologists who have published names of new taxa under the International Code of Zoological Nomenclature.

A 
 Abe – Tokiharu Abe (1911–1996)
 Abeille de Perrin, Ab. – Elzéar Abeille de Perrin (1843–1910)
 Able – Kenneth W. Able (born 1945)
 Abbott, C.C. Abbott – Charles Conrad Abbott (1843–1919) general zoology
 C. Abbott – Charles Abbot (1761–1817) entomology
 J. Abbott – John Abbot (1751–1841) entomology, ornithology
 W. Abbott, Abbott – William Louis Abbott (1860–1936) mainly ornithology
 Acerbi – Giuseppe Acerbi (1773–1846)
 Acero – Arturo Acero Pizarro (born 1954)
 Adams, Ad. – Charles Baker Adams (1814–1853) malacology
 A. Adams – Arthur Adams (1820–1878) mostly marine animals
 A.L. Adams – Andrew Leith Adams (1827–1882) vertebrate paleontology
 D.B. Adams – Daniel B. Adams (fl. 1979) paleontology
 E. Adams – Edward Adams (1824–1856)
 H. Adams – Henry Adams (1813–1877) malacology
 Agassiz, Ag., L. Ag., Agass. – Louis Agassiz (1807–1873) ichthyology, paleontology
 A. Agassiz, A. Ag. – Alexander Emanuel Agassiz (1835–1910) mostly marine animals
 Agenjo – Ramon Agenjo Cecilia (1908–1984)
 Aguilera – Orangel Antonio Aguilera
 D.R. de Aguilera – Dione Rodrigues de Aguilera
 Ahl, E. Ahl – Ernst Ahl (1898–1943) herpetology, ichthyology
 J.N. Ahl, Ahl – Jonas Niclas Ahl
 Ahlquist – Jon Edward Ahlquist (fl. late 20th century)
 Ahlstrom – Elbert Halvor Ahlstrom (1910–1979)
 Ahnelt – Harald Ahnelt
 Aizawa – Masahiro Aizawa
 Akama – Alberto Akama
 Akihito – Emperor Akihito of Japan (born 1933)
 Albert – James S. Albert
 Albertis – Luigi Maria d'Albertis (1841–1901)
 Alcock – Alfred William Alcock (1859–1933)
 Aldrovandi, Aldr. – Ulisse Aldrovandi (1522–1605)
 Alexander, B. Alexander – Boyd Alexander (1873–1910) ornithology
 A. Alexander – Annie Montague Alexander (1867–1950) paleontology
 C. Alexander, Alexander – Charles Paul Alexander (1889–1981) entomology
 H. Alexander – Horace Alexander (1889–1989) ornithology
 W. Alexander – Wilfred Backhouse Alexander (1885–1965) entomology, ornithology
 Alencar – José Eduardo de Alencar Moreira (born 1953)
 Alfaro – Anastasio Alfaro (1865–1951)
 Alifanov – Vladimir R. Alifanov
 Allain – Ronan Allain (born 1974)
 Allen – Edgar Johnson Allen (1866–1942) marine biology
 Allen, J.A. Allen – Joel Asaph Allen (1838–1921) ornithology, American mammals
 A. Allen – Arthur Augustus Allen (1885–1964) ornithology
 G.M. Allen – Glover Morrill Allen (1879–1942) mainly mammals
 G.R. Allen – Gerald R. Allen (born 1942) Ichthyology
 H. Allen – Harrison Allen (1841–1897) Chiroptera
 J.A. Allen – John A. Allen malacology
 Allioni – Carlo Allioni (1728–1804)
 Allman, Allm. – George James Allman (1812–1898)
 Almeida-Toledo – Lurdes Foresti de Almeida Toledo
 Alströmer – Clas Alströmer (1736–1794), a pupil of Linnaeus
 Amadon – Dean Amadon (1912–2003)
 Ambrosio – Alfredo Ambrosio
 Ameghino – Florentino Ameghino (1854–1911)
 Amyot – Charles Jean-Baptiste Amyot (1799–1866)
 Ancey – César Marie Félix Ancey (1860–1906)
 K. Andersen – Knud Andersen (born 1867, disappeared 1918)
 Anderson, J. Anderson – John Anderson (1833–1900) Asian mammals and reptiles
 R. Anderson – Rudolph Martin Anderson (1876–1961) mammals
 S. Anderson – Steven Clement Anderson (born 1936) herpetology
 W. Anderson – William Anderson (1750–1778) general zoology
 André – Jacques Ernest Edmond André (1844–1891)
 Andriyashev, Andriashev, Andrijaschew – Anatoly Petrovich Andriyashev (1910–2009)
 Angas – George French Angas (1822–1886)
 Annandale – Nelson Annandale (1876–1924)
 Anthony – Harold Elmer Anthony (1890–1970)
 Antunes – Miguel Telles Antunes (born 1937)
 Apesteguía – Sebastián Apesteguía
 Appellöf – Adolf Appellöf (1857–1921)
 Archbold – Richard Archbold (1907–1976)
 Archer – William Archer (1830?–1897) microorganisms
 M. Archer – Michael Archer (born 1945) mammals, paleontology
 Arcucci – Andrea B. Arcucci
 Arrow – Gilbert John Arrow (1873–1948)
 Artedi, Arctaedius, Art. – Peter Artedi (1705–1735)
 Asano – Nagao Asano
 Ascanius fl.1772
 Ashmead – William Harris Ashmead (1855–1908)
 Asso – Ignacio Jordán Claudio de Asso y del Rio (1742–1814)
 Atkinson – William Stephen Atkinson (1820–1876)
 Aubé, Aub. – Charles Aubé (1802–1869)
 Audebert, Audeb. – Jean-Baptiste Audebert (1759–1800)
 Audubon, Audub. – John James Audubon (1785–1851)
 Aurivillius, P. Aurivillius, Auriv. – Per Olof Christopher Aurivillius (1853–1928) entomology
 C. Aurivillius – Carl Wilhelm Samuel Aurivillius (1854–1899)
 S. Aurivillius – Sven Magnus Aurivillius (1892–1928) marine zoology
 Ausserer, Auss. – Anton Ausserer (1907–1976)
 Ayling – Tony Ayling (born 1947)
 Ayres, W.O. Ayres – William Orville Ayres (1805–1887) ichthyology
 J.M. Ayres – José Márcio Ayres (1954–2003) primates
 Azara, Az. – Félix de Azara (1746–1821)
 Azmi – Azmi Ambak ichthyology
 Azuma – Yoichi Azuma

B 

 Bachman – John Bachman (1790–1874)
 Bailey – Steven Bailey zoology
 R.G. Bailey – Roland G. Bailey
 R.M. Bailey – Reeve Maclaren Bailey (1911–2011)
 Baillon – Louis Antoine François Baillon (1778–1851)
 Baird – Spencer Fullerton Baird (1823–1887)
 Baker – Edward Charles Stuart Baker (1864–1944)
 Bakker – Robert T. Bakker (born 1945)
 Balanov – Andrei A. Balanov
 C.C. Baldwin – Carole C. Baldwin
 W.J. Baldwin – Wayne J. Baldwin
 Z.H. Baldwin – Zachary Hayward Baldwin
 Balinsky – Boris Balinsky (1905–1997) entomology
 Ball – Valentine Ball (1843–1895)
 Balon – Eugene K. Balon (1930–2013)
 Balouet – Jean-Christophe Balouet (1956–2021) ornithology, paleontology
 Balss – Heinrich Balss (1886–1957)
 Balushkin – Arkadii Vladimirovich Balushkin
 Bandyopadhyay – Saswati Bandyopadhyay
 Bangs – Outram Bangs (1863–1932) vertebrates (mainly birds and mammals)
 Banks – Nathan Banks (1868–1953) entomology
 R. Banks – Richard C. Banks (born 1931)
 Bannerman – David Armitage Bannerman (1886–1979) ornithology
 Bannikov – Alexandre Fedorovich Bannikov
 Bansok – Ros Bansok
 Barbour – Thomas Barbour (1884–1946)
 F.K. Barker – Frederick Keith Barker ornithology
 M.J. Barker – Michael J. Barker
 Barnard fl. 1923
 Barnes & McDunnough – James Halliday McDunnough (1877–1962)
 Barrett – Paul M. Barrett
 Barrows – Walter Bradford Barrows (1855–1923)
 Barsbold – Rinchen Barsbold (born 1935) paleontology (mainly theropod dinosaurs)
 Bartenef – Aleksandr Nikolaevich Bartenev (1882–1946)
 Bartlett – Edward Bartlett (1836–1908) ornithology
 A.D. Bartlett – Abraham Dee Bartlett (1812–1897) general zoology (mainly vertebrates)
 Barton – Benjamin Smith Barton (1766–1815)
 Baskin – Jonathan N. Baskin
 Batchelder – Charles Foster Batchelder (1856–1954)
 Bate – Charles Spence Bate (1819–1889)
 Bates – George Latimer Bates (1863–1940)
 Bateson – William Bateson (1861–1926)
 Bean – Tarleton Hoffman Bean (1846–1916)
  Beatty– Joseph Beatty
 Beavan – Reginald C. Beavan (1841–1870)
 Bechstein – Johann Matthäus Bechstein (1757–1822)
 Beddome – Richard Henry Beddome (1830–1911)
 Bedriaga – Jacques von Bedriaga (1854–1906)
 Behr – Hans Hermann Behr (1818–1904)
 Bell – Thomas Bell (1792–1880)
 Bemmel – Adriaan Cornelis Valentin van Bemmel
 Bendire – Charles Emil Bendire (1863–1940)
 Benitez – Hesiquio Benitez-Diaz
 Bennett – Edward Turner Bennett (1797–1836) general zoology
 F. Bennett – Frederick Debell Bennett (1836–1897)
 Benson – Constantine Walter Benson (1909–1982) ornithology
 R. Benson – Robert Bernard Benson (1904–1967)
 Benson – William Henry Benson (1803–1870) malacology
 Bent – Arthur Cleveland Bent (1866–1954)
 Benton – Michael J. Benton (born 1939)
 Beresford – Pamela Beresford
 Berg – Lev Berg (1876–1950)
 Berkenhout – John Berkenhout (1726–1791)
 Berla – Herbert Franzioni Berla (1912–1985)
 Berland – Lucien Berland (1888–1962)
 Berlepsch – Hans von Berlepsch (1850–1915)
 Berlioz – Jacques Berlioz (1891–1975)
 Berry – Samuel Stillman Berry (1887–1984)
 Bertelsen  – Erik Bertelsen 
 Berthold  – Arnold Adolph Berthold (1803–1861)
 Bertkau – Philipp Bertkau (1849–1894)
 Bezzi – Mario Bezzi (1868–1927) entomology
 Bianco – Pier Giorgio Bianco
 Bibron – Gabriel Bibron (1806–1848)
 Bigot – Jacques-Marie-Frangile Bigot (1818–1893)
 Bilek – Alois Bilek (1909–1974)
 Billberg – Gustaf Johan Billberg (1772–1844)
 Billings – Elkanah Billings (1820–1876) paleontology
 Bingham – Charles Thomas Bingham (1848–1908)
 Biswas – Biswamoy Biswas (1923–1994)
 Blache – Jacques Blache (1922–1994)
 Black – Davidson Black (1884–1934)
 Blackburn – Thomas Blackburn (1844–1912) entomology
 Blackwall – John Blackwall (1790–1881)
 Blainville – Henri Marie Ducrotay de Blainville (1777–1850)
 Blanchard – Charles Émile Blanchard (1819–1900)
 Blanford – William Thomas Blanford (1832–1905)
 Blasius – Johann Heinrich Blasius (1809–1870) general zoology (mainly vertebrates)
 W. Blasius – August Wilhelm Heinrich Blasius (1845–1912) ornithology
 Blatchley – Willis Blatchley (1859–1940)
 Bleeker – Pieter Bleeker (1819–1878)
 Bloch – Marcus Elieser Bloch (1723–1799)
 Bloch fl. 1923
 Blumenbach – Johann Friedrich Blumenbach (1752–1840)
 Blyth – Edward Blyth (1810–1873)
 Bocage – José Vicente Barbosa du Bocage (1823–1907)
 Bocourt – Marie Firmin Bocourt (1819–1904)
 Boddaert – Pieter Boddaert (1730–1795/96)
 Boettger – Oskar Boettger (1833–1910)
 Boetticher – Hans von Boetticher (1886–1958)
 Bogert – Charles Mitchill Bogert (1908–1992) herpetology
 Bohadsch – Johann Baptist Bohadsch (1724–1768) marine zoology
 Boheman – Carl Henrik Boheman (1796–1868)
 F. Boie – Friedrich Boie (1789–1870) general zoology (mainly ornithology, entomology)
 H. Boie – Heinrich Boie (1794–1827) general zoology (mainly herpetology)
 Boisduval – Jean Baptiste Boisduval (1799–1879)
 Bolle – Carl Bolle (1821–1909)
 Bolotsky – Yuri L. Bolotsky
 Bolton – Barry Bolton – entomology
 Bonaparte – Charles Lucien Jules Laurent Bonaparte (1794–1857) ornithology
 J. Bonaparte – José Bonaparte (1928–2020) paleontology (South American dinosaurs)
 Bond – James Bond (1900–1989) ornithology
 Bonelli – Franco Andrea Bonelli (1784–1830) ornithology, entomology
 Bonhote – J. Lewis Bonhote (1875–1922)
 Bonnaterre – Pierre Joseph Bonnaterre (1747–1804)
 Born – Ignaz von Born (1742–1791)
 Borkhausen – Moritz Balthasar Borkhausen (1760–1806)
 Borodin – Nikolai Andreyevich Borodin (1861–1937)
 Borsuk-Bialynicka – Maria Magdalena Borsuk-Białynicka
 Bosc – Louis Augustin Guillaume Bosc (1759–1828)
 Boucard – Adolphe Boucard (1839–1905)
 Bouček – Zdeněk Bouček entomology
 Boulenger – George Albert Boulenger (1858–1937)
 Bourguignat – Jules René Bourguignat (1829–1892)malacology
 Boursin – Charles Boursin (1901–1971)
 Bourcier – Jules Bourcier (1797–1873)
 Bouvier – Eugène Louis Bouvier (1856–1944)
 Bowdich – Thomas Edward Bowdich (1791–1824)
 Bowerbank – James Scott Bowerbank (1797–1877)
 Branch – William Roy Branch (1946–2018), Herpetology
 Brandt – Johann Friedrich von Brandt (1802–1879)
 Brauer – Friedrich Moritz Brauer (1832–1904)
 Brauner – Aleksandr Aleksandrovich Brauner (1857–1941)
 A.E. Brehm – Alfred Brehm (1829–1884) general zoology
 C.L. Brehm – Christian Ludwig Brehm (1787–1864) ornithology
 Bremer – Otto Vasilievich Bremer (died 1873)
 Bremi-Wolf – Johann Jacob Bremi-Wolf (1791–1857)
 Brett-Surman – Michael K. Brett-Surman (born 1950)
 Brevoort – James Carson Brevoort (1818–1887)
 Brewster – William Brewster (1851–1919) ornithology
 Briggs – John Carmon Briggs (born 1920)
 Brischke – Carl Gustav Alexander Brischke (1814–1897)
 Brisson – Mathurin Jacques Brisson (1723–1806)
 Brittinger – Christian Casimir Brittinger (1795–1869)
 Brodkorb – Pierce Brodkorb ornithology, paleontology
 Brøndsted – Holger Valdemar Brøndsted (1893–1977) zoology
 Brongniart – Alexandre Brongniart (1770–1847) paleontology
 C. Brongniart – Charles Jules Edmée Brongniart (1859–1899) paleontology, entomology
 Bronn – Heinrich Georg Bronn (1800–1862)
 Brooke – Victor Brooke (1843–1891)
 Brookes – Joshua Brookes (1761–1833) general zoology
 W.S. Brooks – Winthrop Sprague Brooks (1887–1965)
 Broom – Robert Broom (1866–1951)
 Brown – Barnum Brown (1873–1963)
 Bruch – Carl Friedrich Bruch (1789–1857)
 Bruguière – Jean Guillaume Bruguière (1749–1798)
 Brullé – Gaspard Auguste Brullé (1809–1873)
 Brünnich – Morten Thrane Brünnich (1737–1827)
 Brusatte – Stephen L. Brusatte (born 1984)
 Brusina – Spiridon Brusina (1845–1909)
 H. Bryant – Henry Bryant (1820–1867) general zoology (mainly birds)
 Bryk – Felix Bryk (1882–1957)
 W.E. Bryant – Walter E. Bryant (1861–1905)
 Bücherl – Wolfgang Bücherl
 Buckland – William Buckland (1784–1856)
 Buffetaut – Eric Buffetaut (born 1950)
 Buller – Walter Buller (1838–1906)
 Bunzel – Emanuel Bunzel (1828–1895)
 Burchell – William John Burchell (1782–1863)
 Burge – Donald L. Burge
 Burmeister – Hermann Burmeister (1807–1892)
 Burnett – Gilbert Thomas Burnett (1800–1835)
 Burton – Frederic Burton
 Burns – John McLauren Burns
 Bush – Katharine Jeanette Bush (1855–1937)
 Bussing fl. 1966 (x2)
 Butler – Arthur Gardiner Butler (1844–1925)
 Büttikofer – Johann Büttikofer (1850–1929)
 Buturlin – Sergei Aleksandrovich Buturlin (1872–1938)
 Byrne fl. 1909

C 

 Cabanis – Jean Cabanis (1816–1906)
 Cabrera – Ángel Cabrera (1879–1960)
 Caldwell – David Keller Caldwell (1928–1990)
 Calman – William Thomas Calman (1871–1952)
 Calvert – Philip Powell Calvert (1871–1961)
 Calvo – Jorge Calvo (born 1961)
 Cambiaso – Andrea Cambiaso
 Camerano – Lorenzo Camerano (1856–1917)
 Camp – Charles Lewis Camp (1893–1975)
 Campos – Diógenes de Almeida Campos
 Canestrini – Giovanni Canestrini (1835–1900)
 Cantor, Cant. – Theodore Edward Cantor (1809–1860)
 Caradja – Aristide Caradja (1861–1955)
 Carlson – Bruce A. Carlson
 Carlsson – Albertina Carlsson (1848–1930)
 Carpenter – Kenneth Carpenter (born 1949)
 Carr – Archie Carr (1909–1987)
 Carriker – Melbourne Armstrong Carriker Jr. (1879–1965)
 Carter – Henry John Carter (1813–1895)
 Carvalho – Ismar de Souza Carvalho
 Casey – Thomas Lincoln Casey, Jr. (1857–1925)
 Cassin – John Cassin (1813–1869)
 Castelnau – see Laporte
 Cervigón – Fernando Cervigón (1930–2017)
 Chabanaud – Paul Chabanaud (1876–1959)
 Chabaud – Alain Chabaud (1923–2013) parasitology
 Chamberlin – Ralph Vary Chamberlin (1879–1967)
 J.C.Chamberlin – Joseph Conrad Chamberlin (1898 – 1962) 
 Chapin – James Chapin (1889–1964)
 Chapman – Frank Chapman (1864–1945)
 Charig – Alan Jack Charig (1927–1997)
 Charitonov – Dmitry Evstratievich Kharitonov (1896–1970)
 Charpentier – Toussaint de Charpentier (1779–1847)
 Chasen – Frederick Nutter Chasen (1896–1942)
 Chatterjee – Sankar Chatterjee (born 1943)
 Cherrie – George Kruck Cherrie (1865–1946)
 Chevrolat – Louis Alexandre Auguste Chevrolat (1799–1884) entomology
 Chiaie – Stefano delle Chiaje (1794–1860)
 Chiappe – Luis M. Chiappe
 Children – John George Children (1777–1852)
 Christ – Johann Ludwig Christ (1739–1813)
 Chun – Carl Chun (1852–1914)
 Chure – Daniel Joseph Chure
 Clapp – Cornelia Clapp (1849–1934)
 E. Clark – Eugenie Clark (1922–2015) ichthyology
 H.L. Clark – Hubert Lyman Clark (1870–1947) echinoderms
 J.M. Clark – James Michael Clark
 Clemens – James Brackenridge Clemens
 Clements – Kendall D. Clements
 Clemmer – Glenn H. Clemmer
 Clench – Harry Kendon Clench (1925–1979) Lepidoptera
 Clench – William J. Clench (1897–1984) malacology
 Clerck – Carl Alexander Clerck (1709–1765)
 Cloward – Karen C. Cloward
 Cobbold – Thomas Spencer Cobbold (1828–1886)
 Cochran – Doris M. Cochran (1898–1968)
 Cockerell – Theodore Dru Alison Cockerell (1866–1948)
 Coimbra-Filho – Adelmar Faria Coimbra-Filho
 Colbert – Edwin Harris Colbert (1905–2001)
 Colston – Peter R. Colston (born 1935)
 Compagno – Leonard J. V. Compagno (fl. 1979–present)
 Conci – Cesare Conci (1920–2011)
 Conde – Otto Conde (1905–1944)
 Conover – Henry Boardman Conover (1892–1950)
 Conrad – Timothy Abbott Conrad (1803–1877)
 Coombs – Walter P. Coombs, Jr.
 Cooper, J.G. Cooper – James Graham Cooper (1830–1902) general zoology, particularly ornithology
 Cooper, W. Cooper – William Cooper (1798–1864) malacology
 Cope – Edward Drinker Cope (1840–1897)
 Coquerel – Charles Coquerel (1822–1867)
 Coria – Rodolfo Coria (born 1959)
 Cornalia – Emilio Cornalia (1824–1882)
 Cory – Charles B. Cory (1857–1921)
 Costa – Achille Costa (1823–1898) entomology, particularly Neuroptera
 O. Costa, O.G. Costa – Oronzio Gabriele Costa (1787–1867) entomology and general zoology
 W.J.E.M. Costa – Wilson José Eduardo Moreira da Costa
 Coues – Elliott Coues (1842–1899)
 Cramer – Pieter Cramer (1721–c. 1779) entomology
 F. Cramer – Frank Cramer
 Crampton – William G. R. Crampton
 Cresson – Ezra Townsend Cresson (Senior) (1838–1926) Hymenoptera
 Cresson – Ezra Townsend Cresson, Jr. (1876–1948) Diptera
 Cretzschmar – Philipp Jakob Cretzschmar (1786–1845)
 Crewe – Henry Harpur-Crewe (1828–1883)
 Crotch – George Robert Crotch (1842–1874)
 Crowson – Roy Crowson (1914–1999)
 Crusafont – Miquel Crusafont i Pairó (1910–1983)
 Currie – Philip J. Currie (born 1949)
 Curry Rogers – Kristina Curry Rogers (born 1974)
 Curtis – John Curtis (1791–1862)
 Cuvier – Georges Cuvier (1769–1832) vertebrate zoology, paleontology
 F. Cuvier – Frédéric Cuvier (1773–1838)
 Czerkas – Stephen A. Czerkas

D 

 da Costa – Emanuel Mendes da Costa (1717–1791) malacology
 da Silva – Maria Nazareth F. da Silva (fl. 1990s–present)
 Darwin – Charles Darwin (1809–1882)
 Dahl – Friedrich Dahl (1856–1929)
 Dahlbom – Anders Gustaf Dahlbom (1808–1859)
 Dale – James Charles Dale (1792–1872)
 Dall – William Healey Dall (1845–1927)
 Dalla Torre – Karl Wilhelm von Dalla Torre (1850–1928)
 Dana – James Dwight Dana (1813–1895)
 Daudin – François Marie Daudin (1774–1804)
 David – Armand David (1826–1900)
 Davis – Donald R. Davis (born 1934)
 de Azevedo – Sérgio Alex Kugland de Azevedo
 de Beaufort – Lieven Ferdinand de Beaufort (1879–1968)
 de Blainville – Henri Marie Ducrotay de Blainville (1777–1850)
 de Castelnau – see Laporte
 de Filippi – Filippo de Filippi (1814–1867)
 de Geer, De Geer – Charles De Geer (1720–1778)
 de Haan – Wilhem de Haan (1801–1855)
 De Kay, DeKay, Dekay – James Ellsworth De Kay (1792–1851)
 de Man – Johannes Govertus de Man (1850–1930)
 de Naurois – René de Naurois (1906–2006)
 de Nicéville – Lionel de Nicéville (1852–1901)
 De Pourtalès – Louis François de Pourtalès (1824–1880)
 Bory de Saint-Vincent – Jean Baptiste Bory de Saint-Vincent (1780–1846)
 de Valai – Silvina de Valai
 De Vis – Charles Walter De Vis (1829–1915)
 de Winton – William Edward de Winton (1856–1922)
 Dejean, Dej. – Pierre François Marie Auguste Dejean (1780–1845) entomology
 Delmonte – Alfred Delmonte (born 1977)
 Delacour – Jean Théodore Delacour (1890–1985)
 Delson – Eric Delson
 Denis – Michael Denis (1729–1800)
 Depéret – Charles Depéret (1854–1929)
 Deppe – Ferdinand Deppe (1794–1861)
 Des Murs – Marc Athanase Parfait Œillet des Murs (1804–1878)
 Desfontaines – René Louiche Desfontaines (1750–1833)
 Desmarest – Anselme Gaëtan Desmarest (1784–1838)
 Deville, E. Deville – Émile Deville
 Diard – Pierre-Médard Diard (1794–1863)
 Dieffenbach – Ernst Dieffenbach (1811–1855)
 Dingus – Lowell Dingus
 Distant – William Lucas Distant (1845–1922)
 Djakonov – Alexander Michailovitsch Djakonov (1886–1956)
 Dobson – George Edward Dobson (1844–1895)
 Döderlein – Petar Döderlein (1809–1895)
 Dodson – Peter Dodson (fl. 1980s–present)
 Doherty – William Doherty (1857–1901)
 Dollman – Guy Dollman (1886–1942)
 Dollo – Louis Dollo (1857–1931)
 Donisthorpe, Donis. – Horace Donisthorpe (1870–1951)
 Donovan – Edward Donovan (1768–1837)
 d'Orbigny – Alcide d'Orbigny (1802–1857)
 Dong – Zhiming Dong (born 1937)
 Doria – Giacomo Doria (1840–1913)
 Doubleday – Henry Doubleday (1808–1875)
 Douglas – John William Douglas (1814–1905)
 Drenowsky – Alexander Kirilow Drenowski (1879–1967)
 Drury – Dru Drury (1725–1804)
 du Bus de Gisignies – Bernard du Bus de Gisignies (1808–1874)
 du Chaillu – Paul Belloni Du Chaillu (1831–1903)
 Dubois, C. F. Dubois – Charles Frédéric Dubois (1804–1867)
 Dufour – Léon Jean Marie Dufour (1780–1865)
 Dufresne – Louis Dufresne
 Duftschmid – Caspar Erasmus Duftschmid (1767–1821)
 Dugès – Alfredo Dugès (1826–1910)
 A.M.C. Duméril – André Marie Constant Duméril (1774–1860)
 A.H.A. Duméril – Auguste Duméril (1812–1870)
 Dumont – Charles Dumont de Sainte-Croix (1758–1830)
 Duncker – Paul Georg Egmont Duncker (1870–1953)
 Duponchel – Philogène Auguste Joseph Duponchel (1774–1846)
 Durrell – Gerald Durrell (1925–1995)
 Duvernoy – Georges Louis Duvernoy (1777–1855)
 Dwight – Jonathan Dwight (1858–1929)
 Dyar – Harrison Gray Dyar Jr. (1866–1929)

E 

 Earle – Sylvia Alice Earle (born 1935)
 Eaton – Jeffrey Glenn Eaton (born 1948)
 Edwards – William Henry Edwards (1822–1909)
 Ehrenberg – Christian Gottfried Ehrenberg (1795–1876)
 Eichwald – Karl Eichwald (1795–1876)
 Eigenmann – Carl H. Eigenmann (1863–1927)
 R.S. Eigenmann, R. Smith – Rosa Smith Eigenmann (1858–1947)
 Ellerman – John Ellerman (1910–1973)
 Elliot – Daniel Giraud Elliot (1835–1915)
 Emery – Carlo Emery (1848–1925)
 A.R. Emery – Alan R. Emery
 Enslin – Eduard Enslin (1879–1970)
 Erdős – József Erdös
 Erichson – Wilhelm Ferdinand Erichson (1809–1848)
 Erxleben – Johann Christian Polycarp Erxleben (1744–1777)
Esben-Petersen – Peter Esben-Petersen (1869–1942)
 Eschmeyer – William N. Eschmeyer
 Eschscholtz – Johann Friedrich von Eschscholtz (1793–1831)
 Erséus –  Christer Erséus
 Esper – Eugenius Johann Christoph Esper (1742–1810)
 Evermann – Barton Warren Evermann (1853–1932)
 Eversmann – Eduard Friedrich Eversmann (1794–1860)
 Evseenko – Sergei Afanasievich Evseenko
 Eyton – Thomas Campbell Eyton (1809–1880)

F 

 Fabre – Jean-Henri Casimir Fabre (1823–1915)
 Fabricius – Johan Christian Fabricius (1745–1808)
 Fahringer – Josef Fahringer (1876–1950)
 Fåhraeus – Olof Immanuel von Fåhraeus (1796–1884)
 Fairmaire – Léon Fairmaire (1820–1906)
 Falla – Robert Falla (1901–1979)
 Fallén – Carl Fredrik Fallén (1764–1830)
 Fauvel – Charles Adolphe Albert Fauvel  (1840–1921) insects
 Fauvel – Pierre Fauvel (1866–1958) Polychaetes
 Feinberg – Margaret Norma Feinberg
 C. Felder – Baron Cajetan von Felder (1814–1894) Lepidoptera
 R. Felder – Rudolf Felder (1842–1871) Lepidoptera
 Fenwick – Jack Fenwick
 Fernandes-Matioli – Flora Maria de Campos Fernandes-Matioli
 Ferrari-Perez  – Fernando Ferrari-Pérez (1857–1933)
 Ferraris – Carl J. Ferraris, Jr.
 Férussac – Jean Baptiste Louis d'Audibert de Férussac (1745–1815)
 Filhol – Henri Filhol (1843–1902)
 Finsch – Otto Finsch (1839–1917)
 Fioroni – Pio Fioroni (1933–2003)
 G. Fischer, Fischer de Waldheim, Fischer von Waldheim – Gotthelf Fischer von Waldheim (1771–1853)
 J. Fischer – Johann Baptist Fischer (1803–1832)
 J.G. Fischer – Johann Gustav Fischer (1819–1889)
 M. Fischer – Maximilian Fischer (born 1929)
 Fitch – Asa Fitch (1809–1879)
 Fitzinger – Leopold Fitzinger (1802–1884)
 J.H. Fleming – James Henry Fleming (1872–1940)
 Fleming – John Fleming (1785–1857)
 Fonscolombe – Étienne Laurent Joseph Hippolyte Boyer de Fonscolombe
 Forbes – Edward Forbes (1815–1854)
 Forbes – Henry Ogg Forbes (1851–1932)
 Forel – Auguste-Henri Forel (1848–1931)
 Forsius – Runar Forsius (1884–1935)
 Forsskål – Peter Forsskål (1732–1763)
 Forsyth Major – Charles Immanuel Forsyth Major (1843–1923)
 Forster – Johann Reinhold Forster (1729–1798)
 C.A. Forster – Catherine A. Forster
 G. Forster – Georg Forster (1754–1794)
 R.R. Forster – Raymond Robert Forster (1922–2000) 
 Förster – Arnold Förster (1810–1884)
 Fourmanoir – Pierre Fourmanoir (1924–2007)
 Fowler – Henry Weed Fowler (1879–1965)
 Fox – Wade Fox (1920–1964)
 Fraas – Eberhard Fraas (1862–1915)
 Franganillo-Balboa – Pelegrin Franganillo-Balboa (1873–1955)
 Franklin – James Franklin (c. 1783–1834)
 Fransen – Charles Fransen
 Fraser – Louis Fraser (1810–1866)
 F.C. Fraser – Frederick Charles Fraser
 Freyer – Christian Friedrich Freyer (1794–1885) entomologist mainly interested in Lepidoptera
 Friedmann – Herbert Friedmann (1900–1987)
 Fricke – Ronald Fricke
 Frivaldszky – Imre Frivaldszky (1799–1870)
 Frohawk – Frederick William Frohawk (1861–1946)
 Fromont – Jane Fromont
 Fruhstorfer – Hans Fruhstorfer (1866–1922)
 Fürbringer – Max Fürbringer (1846–1920)
 Füssli, Fuessly, Füsslins – Johann Kaspar Füssli (1743–1786)

G 

 Gadow – Hans Friedrich Gadow (1855–1928)
 Gahan – Charles Joseph Gahan (1862–1939) for Cerambycidae or Arthur Burton Gahan (1880—1960) for Hymenoptera
 Gaimard – Joseph Paul Gaimard (1796–1858)
 F. Galton, Galton – Francis Galton (1822–1911)
 P. M. Galton – Peter Galton
 Gambel – William Gambel (1823–1849)
 Gao – Keqin Gao (born 1955)
 Garman – Samuel Garman (1843–1927)
 Garnot – Prosper Garnot (1794–1838)
 Garstang – Walter Garstang (1868–1949)
 Gaston – Robert Gaston (born 1967)
 Gasparini – Zulma Brandoni de Gasparini
 Gauthier – Jacques Gauthier (born 1948)
 Gegenbaur – Carl Gegenbaur (1825–1903)
 Gené – Giuseppe Gené (1800–1847)
 É. Geoffroy Saint-Hilaire – Étienne Geoffroy Saint-Hilaire (1772–1844)
 I. Geoffroy Saint-Hilaire – Isidore Geoffroy Saint-Hilaire (1805–1861)
 Georgi – Johann Gottlieb Georgi (1729–1802)
 Germar – Ernst Friedrich Germar (1786–1853)
 Gerstäcker – Carl Eduard Adolph Gerstäcker (1828–1895)
 Gertsch – Willis J. Gertsch (1906–1998)
 Gervais – Paul Gervais (1816–1879)
 Géry – Jacques Géry ichthyology
 Geyer – Carl Geyer entomology
 Geyer – Charles Andreas Geyer (1809–1853) botany, American
 Gielis – Cees Gielis
 Giglioli – Enrico Hillyer Giglioli (1845–1909)
 Gilbert – Charles Henry Gilbert (1859–1928)
 Gilchrist – John Dow Fisher Gilchrist (1866–1926)
 Gill – Theodore Nicholas Gill (1837–1914)
 Gillette – David D. Gillette
 Gilmore – Charles W. Gilmore (1874–1945)
 Girard – Charles Frédéric Girard (1822–1895)
 Giraud – Joseph Etienne Giraud (1808–1877)
 Girault – Alec Arsène Girault entomology
 Gloger – Constantin Wilhelm Lambert Gloger (1803–1863)
 Gmelin – Johann Friedrich Gmelin (1748–1804)
 Godart – Jean-Baptiste Godart (1775–1825)
 Godefroit – Pascal Godefroit
 Godman – Frederick DuCane Godman (1834–1919)
 Goeze – Johann August Ephraim Goeze (1731–1793)
 Göhlich – Ursula Bettina Göhlich
 Goldfuss – Georg August Goldfuss (1782–1848)
 Goldman – E. A. Goldman
 Goode – George Brown Goode (1851–1896)
 Gosse – Philip Henry Gosse (1810–1888)
 A. A. Gould – Augustus Addison Gould (1805–1866) conchology
 Gould – John Gould (1804–1881) birds and mammals
 Graffin – Greg Graffin (1964–present) paleozoology/evolutionary biology
 A. Grandidier – Alfred Grandidier (1836–1921)
 G. Grandidier – Guillaume Grandidier (1873–1957)
 Grandin – Temple Grandin (born 1947)
 Granger – Walter W. Granger (1872–1941)
 Grant – Chapman Grant (1887–1983) herpetology
 Grant – Ulysses S. Grant IV (1893–1977) malacology, paleontology
 Gravenhorst – Johann Ludwig Christian Gravenhorst (1777–1857)
 G. R. Gray – George Robert Gray (1808–1872) entomology, ornithology
 J. E. Gray – John Edward Gray (1800–1875)
 Green – Edward Ernest Green (1861–1949)
 Gregory – William K. Gregory (1876–1970)
 Griffith – Edward Griffith (1790–1858)
 J. N. Griffith – Jeremy Griffith (born 1945)
 Grimpe – Georg Grimpe (1889–1936)
 Grinnell – Joseph Grinnell (1877–1939)
 Griscom – Ludlow Griscom (1890–1959)
 Grobben – Karl Grobben (1854–1945)
 Gronow – Laurence Theodore Gronow (fl. 1854) ichthyology
 A. Grote, Grote – Augustus Radcliffe Grote (1841–1903) entomology
 H. Grote – Hermann Grote ornithology
 Grube – Adolph Eduard Grube (1812–1880) zoology
 Grumm-Grzhimailo – Grigory Grum-Grshimailo (1860–1936) entomology
 Guenee, Guenée – Achille Guenée (1809–1880)
 Guerin, Guérin-Méneville – Félix Édouard Guérin-Méneville (1799–1874)
 Güldenstädt – Johann Anton Güldenstädt (1745–1781)
 Gunnerus – Johann Ernst Gunnerus (1718–1773)
 Gunter – Gordon P. Gunter (1909–1998)
 Günther – Albert C. L. G. Günther (1830–1914)
 Gurney – John Henry Gurney (1819–1890)
 J. H. Gurney Jr – John Henry Gurney Jr. (1848–1922)
 Gyllenhaal – Leonard Gyllenhaal (1752–1840)

H 

 Habe – Tadashige Habe (1916–2001)
 Hiren – Hiren B Parmar (born 1985)
 Hablizl – Carl Ludwig Hablitz (1752–1821)
 Hachisuka – Masauji Hachisuka (1903–1953)
 Hadiaty – Renny Kurnia Hadiaty
 Hadie – Wartono Hadie
 Haeckel – Ernst Haeckel (1834–1919)
 Hagen – Hermann August Hagen (1817–1893)
 Hahn – Carl Wilhelm Hahn (1786–1835)
 Haldeman – Samuel Stehman Haldeman (1812–1880)
 Haliday – Alexander Henry Haliday (1807–1870)
 Hallowell – Edward Hallowell (1808–1860) herpetology 
 Hamilton, Hamilton-Buchanan – Francis Buchanan-Hamilton (1762–1829)
 Hammer – William R. Hammer
 Hampson – George Hampson (1860–1936)
 Handlirsch – Anton Handlirsch (1865–1935)
 Hanley – Sylvanus Charles Thorp Hanley (1819–1899)
 Hansemann – Johann Wilhelm Adolf Hansemann (1784–1862)
 Hansen – Hans Jacob Hansen (1855–1936)
 Harcourt – Edward William Vernon Harcourt (1825–1891)
 Hardwicke – Thomas Hardwicke (1755–1835)
 Harlan – Richard Harlan (1796–1843)
 Harper – Francis Harper (1886–1972)
 Harris, M. Harris – Moses Harris (1734–1785) entomology
 T.W. Harris – Thaddeus Williams Harris (1795–1856)
 Harrison – Colin James Oliver Harrison (1926–2003)
 Hartert – Ernst Hartert (1859–1933)
 Hartig – Theodor Hartig (1805–1880)
 Hartlaub – Gustav Hartlaub (1814–1900)
 Hassall – Arthur Hill Hassall (1817–1894)
 Haswell – William Aitcheson Haswell (1854–1925)
 Hatcher – John Bell Hatcher (1861–1904)
 Hatschek – Berthold Hatschek (1854–1941)
 Haubold – Hartmut Haubold
 Haworth – Adrian Hardy Haworth (1767–1833)
 Hay – William Perry Hay (1872–1947)
 Hayman – Robert William Hayman
 Head – Jason James Head
 Heads – Sam W. Heads
 Heaney – Lawrence Richard Heaney
 Heckel – Johann Jakob Heckel (1790–1857)
 Hector – James Hector (1834–1907)
 Heemstra – Phillip C. Heemstra
 Hellén – Wolter Edward Hellén (1890–1979)
 Heller – Joseph Heller (born 1941)
 Hellmayr – Carl Edward Hellmayr (1878–1944)
 Hemprich – Wilhelm Hemprich (1796–1825)
 Henle – Friedrich Gustav Jakob Henle (1809–1885)
 Henshaw – Henry Wetherbee Henshaw (1850–1930)
 Hentz – Nicholas Marcellus Hentz (1797–1856)
 Herbst – Johann Friedrich Wilhelm Herbst (1743–1807)
 Herdman – William Abbott Herdman (1858–1924)
 Hering – Erich Martin Hering (1893–1967)
 Herman – Ottó Herman (1835–1914)
 Hermann – Johann Hermann (1738–1800)
 Herre – Albert William Christian Theodore Herre (1869–1962)
 Herrich-Schäffer – Gottlieb August Wilhelm Herrich-Schäffer (1799–1874)
 Hershkovitz – Philip Hershkovitz (1909–1997)
 Hertlein – Leo George Hertlein (1898–1972)
 Heude – Pierre Marie Heude (1836–1902)
 Heuglin – Theodor von Heuglin (1824–1876)
 Heuvelmans – Bernard Heuvelmans (1916–2001)
 Hewitson – William Chapman Hewitson (1806–1878)
 Heydenreich – Gustav Heinrich Heydenreich (fl. mid-19th century)
 Heymons – Richard Heymons (1867–1943)
 Hildebrand – Samuel Frederick Hildebrand (1883–1949)
 Hilgendorf – Franz Martin Hilgendorf (1839–1904)
 Hilsenberg – Carl Theodor Hilsenberg (1802–1824)
 Hinton – Martin Hinton (1883–1961)
 Hirohito – Shōwa Emperor Hirohito (1901–1989)
 Hirst – Arthur Stanley Hirst (1883–1930) arachnology, British
 Hirst – David B. Hirst arachnology, Australian
 Hiyama – Yoshio Hiyama (1909–1988)
 Hodgson – Brian Houghton Hodgson (1800–1894)
 Hoese – Douglass F. Hoese
 Hoffmannsegg – Johann Centurius Hoffmannsegg (1766–1849)
 Hoffstetter – Robert Hoffstetter (fl. 19th century)
 Holbrook – John Edwards Holbrook (1794–1871)
 Holland – William Jacob Holland (1848–1932)
 Holmberg – Eduardo Ladislao Holmberg (1852–1937)
 Holmgren – August Emil Holmgren (1829–1888)
 Holmgren (N.Holmgren) Nils Holmgren (1877–1954)
 Holthuis – Lipke Bijdeley Holthuis (1921–2008)
 Hombron – Jacques Bernard Hombron (1798–1852)
 Honrath – Eduard Honrath (1837–1893)
 Hope – Frederick William Hope (1797–1862)
 Horn – George Henry Horn (1840–1897)
 W. Horn – Walther Hermann Richard Horn (1871–1939)
 Horner – Jack Horner (born 1946)
 Horsfield – Thomas Horsfield (1773–1859)
 Horváth – Géza Horváth (1847–1937)
 Hose – Charles Hose (1863–1929)
 Hottinger – Lukas Hottinger (1933–2011)
 Houttuyn – Martinus Houttuyn (1720–1798)
 Howard – Hildegarde Howard (1901–1998)
 Howell, A.H. Howell – Arthur H. Howell (1872–1940)
 Howes – William George Howes (1879–1946)
 Hoyle – William Evans Hoyle (1855–1926)
 Hu – Yaoming Hu
 Hübner – Jacob Hübner (1761–1826)
 Hubbs – Carl Leavitt Hubbs (1894–1979)
 Huene, von Huene – Friedrich von Huene (1875–1969)
 Huey – Laurence Markham Huey (1892–1963)
 Hulke – John Whitaker Hulke (1830–1895)
 Hume – Allan Octavian Hume (1829–1912)
 Humphrey – Philip Strong Humphrey (1926–2009)
 Hunt – Adrian P. Hunt
 Hürzeler – Johannes Hürzeler
 Hutt – Steve Hutt
 J.S. Huxley – Julian Sorell Huxley (1887–1975) general zoology
 T.H. Huxley – Thomas Henry Huxley (1825–1895) general zoology
 Hwang – Sunny H. Hwang

I 

 Ida – Hitoshi Ida (born 1940)
 Iredale – Tom Iredale (1880–1972)
 Illiger – Johann Karl Wilhelm Illiger (1775–1813)
 Ivantsoff – Walter Ivantsoff
 Ivie – Michael Aaron Ivie
 Ivie – Wilton Ivie
 Iwai – Tamotsu Iwai

J 

 Jacobs – Jean-Charles Jacobs (1821–1907) entomology (Diptera, Hymenoptera)
 Jacquin – Nicolaus Joseph von Jacquin (1727–1817) mainly tropical American taxa
 Jacquinot – Honoré Jacquinot (1815–1887) mainly marine biology
 Jain – Sohan Lal Jain vertebrate paleontology
 Jakowlew – Alexander Ivanovich Yakovlev (1863–1909)
 James – Helen F. James (paleo)ornithology
 Jameson – Robert Jameson (1774–1854) general zoology
 Jamieson – Alan J. Jamieson (marine biologist)
 Janensch – Werner Janensch (1878–1969) vertebrate paleontology (East African sauropods)
 Janson – Oliver Erichson Janson (1850–1926) entomology (Coleoptera)
 Jardine – William Jardine (1800–1874) general zoology
 Jebb – Matthew H. P. Jebb
 Jeffreys – John Gwyn Jeffreys (1809–1885)
 Jekel – Henri Jekel (1816–1891) 
 Jenkins – James Travis Jenkins (1876–1959)
 A. P. Jenkins – Aaron Peter Jenkins
 Jensen – James A. Jensen (1918–1998) vertebrate paleontology
 Jerdon – Thomas C. Jerdon (1811–1872) general zoology (South Asia)
 Q. Ji – Qiang Ji
 S. Ji – Shuan Ji
 Jiménez de la Espada  – Marcos Jiménez de la Espada (1831–1898) vertebrate zoology
 Jocqué – Rudy Jocqué
 G. D. Johnson – G. David Johnson
 Johnston – George Johnston
 Jordan – David Starr Jordan (1851–1931) ichthyology
 K. Jordan – Karl Jordan (1861–1959) entomology (Coleoptera, Lepidoptera, Siphonaptera)
 Jouanin – Christian Jouanin
 Jourdan – Claude Jourdan

K 

 Kaila – Lauri Kaila
 Karg – Wolfgang Karg (1927–2016)
 Karsch – Ferdinand Karsch
 Katayama – Masao Katayama (born 1912)
 Kaup – Johann Jakob Kaup (1803–1873)
 Kay – E. Alison Kay (1928–2008)
 Keferstein – Wilhelm Moritz Keferstein (1833–1870)
 Kelaart – Edward Frederick Kelaart (1819–1860)
 Kellner – Alexander Wilhelm Armin Kellner
 Kellogg – Remington Kellogg (1892–1969)
 L. Kellogg – Vernon Lyman Kellogg (1867–1937)
 Kennard – Frederic Hedge Kennard (1865–1937)
 Kennedy – Clarence Hamilton Kennedy (1879–1952)
 Kennicott – Robert Kennicott (1835–1866)
 Kerr – Robert Kerr (1755–1813)
 Kessler – Karl Fedorovich Kessler (1815–1881)
 Keulemans – John Gerrard Keulemans (1842–1912)
 Keyserling – Eugen von Keyserling (1833–1889)
 Kieffer – Jean-Jacques Kieffer (1857–1925)
 Kielan-Jaworowska – Zofia Kielan-Jaworowska (1925–2015)
 King – Phillip Parker King (1793–1856)
 Kinnear – Norman Boyd Kinnear (1882–1957)
 Kirby – William Kirby (1759–1850)
 W. F. Kirby – William Forsell Kirby (1844–1912)
 Kirkaldy – George Willis Kirkaldy
 Kirkland – James Ian Kirkland (born 1954)
 Kishida – Kyukichi Kishida (1888–1968)
 Kittlitz – Heinrich von Kittlitz (1799–1874)
 O. Kleinschmidt – Otto Kleinschmidt (1870–1954)
 Kloss – Cecil Boden Kloss (1877–1949)
 Klotzsch – Johann Friedrich Klotzsch (1805–1860)
 Klug – Johann Christoph Friedrich Klug (1775–1856)
 Kner – Rudolf Kner (1810–1868)
 Knoch – August Wilhelm Knoch (1742–1818)
 Kobayashi – Yoshitsugu Kobayashi
 C. L. Koch – Carl Ludwig Koch (1778–1857)
 L. Koch – Ludwig Carl Christian Koch (1825–1908)
 Koelz – Walter Norman Koelz (1895–1989)
 Kolbe – Hermann Julius Kolbe (1855–1939)
 Kollar – Vincenz Kollar (1797–1860)
 Kollman – Max Kollmann
 Konings – Ad Konings
 Kono – Hiromichi Kono (1905–1963)
 Konow – Friedrich Wilhelm Konow (1842–1908)
 Korshunov – Yuri Korshunov (1933–2002)
 Kotlyar – Aleksandr N. Kotlyar
 Kotthaus – Adolf Kotthaus
 Kraglievich – Lucas Kraglievich
 Kraatz – Ernst Gustav Kraatz (1831–1909)
 Krauss – Christian Ferdinand Friedrich Krauss (1812–1890)
 Krauss – Hermann August Krauss (1848–1939)
 Krabbe – Niels Krabbe (born 1951)
 Krefft – Johann Ludwig Gerard Krefft (1830–1881)
 Krefft – Gerhard Krefft (1912–1993)
 Kriechbaumer – Joseph Kriechbaumer (1819–1902)
 Krohn – August David Krohn (1803–1891)
 Kropotkin – Peter Kropotkin (1842–1921)
 Ksepka – Daniel T. Ksepka
 Kuhl – Heinrich Kuhl (1797–1821)
 Kuiter – Rudolf Herman Kuiter (born 1943)
 Kulczynski – Władysław Kulczyński (1854−1919)
 Kuroda – Nagamichi Kuroda (1889–1978)
 Kurzanov – Sergei Mikhailovich Kurzanov

L 

 Labillardière – Jacques Labillardière (1755–1834)
 Lacépède – Bernard Germain de Lacépède (1756–1825)
 Lacordaire – Jean Théodore Lacordaire (1801–1870)
 Lafresnaye – Frédéric de Lafresnaye (1783–1861)
 Laicharting – Johann Nepomuk von Laicharting (1754–1797)
 Lamarck – Jean-Baptiste Lamarck (1744–1829)
 Lamanna – Matthew Carl Lamanna
 Lambe – Lawrence Morris Lambe (1863–1919)
 Lambrecht – Kálmán Lambrecht
 Lameere – Auguste Lameere (1864–1942)
 Landbeck – Christian Ludwig Landbeck (1807–1890)
 Langer – Max Cardoso Langer
 Langston – Wann Langston, Jr. (1921–2013)
 Laporte – François-Louis Laporte, comte de Castelnau (1802–1880)
 Lapparent, de Lapparent – Albert-Félix de Lapparent (1905–1975)
 Larson – Helen K. Larson
 Latham – John Latham (1740–1837)
 Latreille – Pierre André Latreille (1762–1833)
 Laurent – Michèle de Saint Laurent (1926–2003) French carcinologist
 Laurenti – Josephus Nicolaus Laurenti (1735–1805)
 Laurillard – Charles Léopold Laurillard (1783–1853)
 Lavocat – René Lavocat
 Lawrence – George Newbold Lawrence (1806–1895)
 Lawrence – Barbara Lawrence (1909–1997)
 R.F. Lawrence – Reginald Frederick Lawrence (1897–1987)
 Laxmann – Erik Laxmann (1737–1796)
 Layard – Edgar Leopold Layard (1824–1900)
 Lea – Arthur Mills Lea (1868–1932)
 LeConte – John Lawrence LeConte (1825–1883)
 Leach – William Elford Leach (1791–1836)
 Leach – Edwin S. Leach (1878–1971)
 Lee – Yuong-Nam Lee
 Leech – John Henry Leech (1862–1900)
 Lehtinen – Pekka T. Lehtinen
 Leidy – Joseph Leidy (1823–1891)
 Leisler – Johann Philipp Achilles Leisler (1771–1813)
 Le Leouff – Jean Le Leouff
 Lembeye – Juan Lembeye (1816–1889)
 Lendzion – Kazimiera Lendzion
 Lepeletier – Amédée Louis Michel le Peletier, comte de Saint-Fargeau (1770–1845)
 Lesson – René-Primevère Lesson (1794–1849)
 Le Souef – Dudley Le Souef (1856–1923)
 Lesueur – Charles Alexandre Lesueur (1778–1846)
 Leuckart – Rudolf Leuckart (1822–1898)
 Leussler – R. A. Leussler
 Li – Li Sizhong (1921–2009)
 C.K. Li (also C.-K. Li or C. Li) – Chuankui Li
 D.Q. Li (also D.-Q. Li or D. Li) – Daqing Li
 P.P. Li (also P.-P. Li or P. Li) – Pipeng Li
 Lichtenstein – Martin Lichtenstein (1780–1867)
 Lilljeborg – Wilhelm Lilljeborg (1816–1908)
 Link – Johann Heinrich Friedrich Link (1767–1850)
 Linnaeus – Carl Linnaeus (1707–1778)
 Lindl. – John Lindley (1799–1865)
 Linsley – Earle Gorton Linsley (1910–2000)
 Lintner – Joseph Albert Lintner (1822–1898)
 Ljungh – Sven Ingemar Ljungh (1757–1828)
 Loche – Victor Loche (1806–1863)
 Lönnberg – Einar Lönnberg (1864–1942)
 Lowe – Richard Thomas Lowe (1802–1874)
 Lowe – Percy Lowe (1870–1948)
 Lowry – James K. Lowry (1942 -
 Y.Y. Lu (also Y.-Y. Lu or Y. Lu) – Yuyan Lu
 Lü (also J.C. Lü, J.-C. Lü or J. Lü) – Junchang Lü
 S.Q. Lü (also S.-Q. Lü or S. Lü) – Shunqin Lü
 Lubbock – John Lubbock, 1st Baron Avebury (1834–1913)
 Luc – Michel Luc (1927–2010) nematology 
 Lucas – Hippolyte Lucas (1814–1899)
 F.A. Lucas – Frederic Augustus Lucas (1852–1929)
 S.G. Lucas – Spencer G. Lucas
 Lull – Richard Swann Lull (1867–1957)
 Lund – Peter Wilhelm Lund (1801–1880)
 Lütken – Christian Frederik Lütken (1827–1901)
 Lydekker – Richard Lydekker (1849–1915)
 Lyon – Marcus Ward Lyon, Jr. (1875–1942)

M 

 Mabile – Jules François Mabille (1831–1904)
 Macleay – William John Macleay (1820–1891)
 Mackovicky – Peter J. Mackovicky
 Makela – Robert R. Makela (1940–1987)
 Malaise – René Malaise (1892–1978)
 Maleev – Evgenii Aleksandrovich Maleev (1915–1966)
 Mannerheim – Carl Gustaf Mannerheim (1797–1854)
 Mantell – Gideon Mantell (1790–1852)
 Marcus – Ernst Marcus (1893–1968)
 Marinescu – Florian Marinescu
 Markevich – Aleksandr Prokofyevich Markevich (1905–1999)
 Marples – Brian J. Marples
 Marsh – Othniel Charles Marsh (1831–1899)
 Marshall – Guy Anstruther Knox Marshall (1871–1959)
 Marhsall – Thomas Ansell Marshall (1827–1903)
 Martill – David Martill
 Martin – William Charles Linnaeus Martin (1798–1864) mainly mammals
 C. Martin – Claro Martin
 L. Martin – Larry Martin (1943–2013) paleontology
 Martinez – Ruben D. Martinez
 R. Martínez Escarbassiere – Rafael Martínez Escarbassiere (1929–2022)
 Marvin – Nigel Marven (born 1960)
 Maryanska – Teresa Maryańska
 Mason – Francis Mason (1799–1874)
 Massy – Anne Letitia Massy (1867–1931)
 Mateus – Octávio Mateus (born 1975)
 Mathews – Gregory Mathews (1876–1949)
 Matley – Charles Alfred Matley (1866–1947)
 Matschie – Paul Matschie (1861–1926)
 Matsubara – Kiyomatsu Matsubara (1907–1968)
 Matsumura – Shōnen Matsumura (1872–1960)
 Matsuura – Keiichi Matsuura
 Mayr – Ernst Mayr (1904–2005) vertebrates, mainly birds
 G. Mayr – Gerald Mayr prehistoric vertebrates, mainly birds
 McCulloch – Allan Riverstone McCulloch (1885–1925)
 McLachlan – Robert McLachlan (1837–1904)
 Meade-Waldo – Edmund Meade-Waldo (1855–1934)
 Mearns – Edgar Alexander Mearns (1856–1916)
 Meek – Seth Eugene Meek (1859–1914)
 Meguro – Katsusuke Meguro
 Méhely – Lajos Méhelÿ (1862–1953)
 Meigen – Johann Wilhelm Meigen (1764–1845)
 Mello-Leitão – Cândido Firmino de Mello-Leitão (1886–1948)
 Melsheimer – Frederick Ernst Melsheimer (1782–1873)
 Menezes – Naercio Aquino de Menezes (born 1937)
 Ménétries – Édouard Ménétries (1802–1861)
 Merrem – Blasius Merrem (1761–1824)
 Merrett – Nigel Merrett
 Merriam – Clinton Hart Merriam (1855–1942)
 Mertens – Robert Mertens (1894–1975)
 Metcalfe – John William Metcalfe (1872–1952)
 Metschnikoff, Mechnikov – Ilya Ilyich Mechnikov (1845–1916)
 Meyen – Franz Meyen (1804–1840)
 Meyer, von Meyer – Christian Erich Hermann von Meyer (1801–1869) paleontology
 A.B. Meyer – Adolf Bernhard Meyer (1840–1911) birds, primates, entomology (mainly Wallacea)
 F.A. Meyer, F.A.A. Meyer, Meyer – Friedrich Albrecht Anton Meyer (1768–1795) birds, primates
 Meyer de Schauensee – Rodolphe Meyer de Schauensee (1901–1984) birds
 Meyrick – Edward Meyrick (1854–1938)
 Michener – Charles Duncan Michener (1918–2015)
 Middendorf, Midd. – Alexander von Middendorff (1815–1894)
 Midgley – Steven Hamar Midgley
 Miles – Clifford Miles
 Millard – Naomi A. H. Millard (1914–1997) Hydroida
 Miller – Gerrit Smith Miller Jr. (1869–1956) mammals
 A.H. Miller – Alden H. Miller
 J.F. Miller – John Frederick Miller (1759–1796) mainly vertebrates
 L.H. Miller – Loye H. Miller paleontology, mainly birds
 R.R. Miller – Robert Rush Miller (1916–2003) fish
 Millet – Pierre-Aimé Millet (1783–1873)
 Milne-Edwards – Henri Milne-Edwards (1800–1885) mammals and crustaceans
 A. Milne-Edwards – Alphonse Milne-Edwards (1835–1900) birds
 Milner – Angela C. Milner
 Miranda-Ribeiro – Alípio de Miranda-Ribeiro (1874–1939)
 P. Miranda-Ribeiro – Paulo de Miranda Ribeiro (1901–1965)
 Mitchell – Thomas Mitchell (1792–1855)
 Mitchill – Samuel Latham Mitchill (1764–1831)
 Mitra – Tridib Ranjan Mitra
 Mizuno – Nobuhiko Mizuno
 Mochizuki – Kenji Mochizuki
 Mocsáry – Alexander Mocsáry (1841–1915)
 Mohr – Erna Mohr (1894–1968)
 Molina – Juan Ignacio Molina (1740–1829)
 Molnar – Ralph E. Molnar
 Mondolfi – Edgardo Mondolfi (1918–1999)
 Mones – Álvaro Mones (born 1942)
 Montagu – George Montagu (1753–1815)
 Moore – Frederic Moore (1830–1907) butterflies and moths
 J.C. Moore – Joseph Curtis Moore (1914–1995) rodents
 Mori – Tamezo Mori (1884–1962)
 Moreno – Francisco Moreno (1852–1919)
 Morley – Claude Morley (1874–1951)
 Morrow – James Edwin Morrow, Jr. (born 1918)
 Mortensen – Ole Theodor Jensen Mortensen (1868–1952)
 Möschler – Heinrich Benno Möschler (1831–1888)
 Motomura – Hiroyuki Motomura fish, scorpionfish
 Motschulsky – Victor Ivanovitsch Motschulsky (1810–1871)
 Mound – Laurence Alfred Mound (born 1934) 
 Moure – Jesus Santiago Moure (1912–2010)
 Mourer-Chauviré – Cécile Mourer-Chauviré
 Moyer – Jack T. Moyer (1929–2004)
 Muche – Werner Heinz Muche (1911–1987)
 J.P. Müller, Müller – Johannes Peter Müller (1801–1858) mainly fish
 O.F. Müller – Otto Friedrich Müller (1730–1784) insects, fauna of Scandinavia
 Statius Müller, or P.L.S. Müller according to the IUCN  – Philipp Ludwig Statius Müller (1725–1776) birds, insects, some mammals and others
 Müller – Salomon Müller (1804–1864) mainly fauna of Indonesia
 Mulsant – Étienne Mulsant (1797–1880)
 Munday – Philip L. Munday
 Muricy – Guilherme Muricy (1964 -) sponges, their chemistry & taxonomy
 Murphy – Robert Cushman Murphy (1887–1973)
 Murray – J. A. Murray
 Muttkowski – Richard Anthony Muttkowski (1887–1943)

N 

 Nabokov – Vladimir Nabokov (1899–1977)
 Nadler – Tilo Nadler (born 1941)
 Naef – Adolf Naef (1883–1949)
 Nagao – Takumi Nagao
 Naish – Darren Naish
 J. F. Naumann – Johann Friedrich Naumann (1780–1857)
 Natterer – Johann Natterer (1787–1843)
 Navás – Longinos Navás (1858–1938)
 Nehring – Alfred Nehring (1845–1904)
 Nelson – Edward William Nelson (1855–1934)
 Nelson – Joseph S. Nelson (1937–2011)
 Nesov, Nessov – Lev Alexandrovich Nesov (1947–1995)
 Netting – M. Graham Netting (1904–1996) herpetology
 Neumoegen – Berthold Neumoegen (1845–1895)
New – Tim R. New 
 Newman – Edward Newman (1801–1876)
 A. Newton – Alfred Newton (1829–1907)
 E. Newton – Edward Newton (1832–1897)
 Nichols – Albert Russell Nichols (1859–1933)
 Nichols – John Treadwell Nichols (1883–1958)
 Nielsen – Cesare Nielsen (1898–1984)
 Nikolskii – Aleksandr Mikhailovich Nikolskii (1858–1942)
 Nilsson – Sven Nilsson (1787–1883)
 Nitsche – Hinrich Nitsche (1845–1902)
 Noble – Gladwyn Kingsley Noble (1894–1940)
 Nopcsa – Franz Nopcsa von Felső-Szilvás (1877–1933)
 Norell – Mark A. Norell (born 1957)
 Norman – John Richardson Norman (1899–1944)
 D. Norman – David B. Norman (born 1952)
 North – Alfred John North (1855–1917)
 Novas – Fernando Emilio Novas
 Nowinski – Aleksander Nowiński
 Nuttall – Thomas Nuttall (1786–1859)
 Nylander – William Nylander (1822–1899)

O 

 Oberholser – Harry Church Oberholser (1870–1963)
 Oberthür – Charles Oberthür (1845–1924)
 Obraztsov – Nicholas Sergeyevitch Obraztsov (1906–1966)
 Ochiai – Akira Ochiai (1923–2017)
 Ogilby – William Ogilby (1808–1873) general zoology
 J.D. Ogilby – James Douglas Ogilby (1853–1925) ichthyology
 Ogilvie-Grant – William Robert Ogilvie-Grant (1863–1924)
 Ognev – Sergej Ognew (1886–1951)
 Oguma – Mamoru Oguma (1885–1971)
 Okamoto – Makoto Okamoto
 Oken – Lorenz Oken (1779–1851)
 Okumura – Teiichi Okumura
 Olfers – Ignaz von Olfers (1793–1872)
 Oliver – Walter Oliver (1883–1957)
 Olivi – Giuseppe Olivi (1769–1795)
 Olivier – Guillaume-Antoine Olivier (1756–1814)
 Olson – Storrs Olson (1944–2021)
 Oppel – Nicolaus Michael Oppel (1782–1820)
 Ord – George Ord (1781–1866)
 Osbeck – Pehr Osbeck (1723–1805)
 Osborn – Herbert Osborn (1856–1954) entomology
 Osborn – Henry Fairfield Osborn (1857–1935) paleontology
 Osgood – Wilfred Hudson Osgood (1875–1947)
 Osi – Attila Ősi
 Osmólska – Halszka Osmólska (1930–2008)
 Osthelder – Ludwig Osthelder (1877–1954)
 Ostrom – John Ostrom (1928–2005)
 Oudemans – Anthonie Cornelis Oudemans (1858–1943)
 Oustalet – Emile Oustalet (1844–1905)
 Owen – Richard Owen (1804–1892)

P 

 Packard – Alpheus Spring Packard (1839–1905) entomology, paleontology
 Palisot de Beauvois – Ambroise Marie François Joseph Palisot, Baron de Beauvois (1752–1820) botany, entomology
 Pallas – Peter Simon Pallas (1741–1811) botany, zoology
 Palmer – Theodore Sherman Palmer (1868–1955)
 Panzer – Georg Wolfgang Franz Panzer (1755–1829) entomology
 Parenti – Lynne R. Parenti
 Parks – William Arthur Parks (1868–1939)
 Pascoe – Francis Polkinghorne Pascoe (1813–1893) entomology
 Patzner – ≠Robert A. Patzner
 Paul – Gregory S. Paul (born 1954)
 Pax – Ferdinand Albert Pax (1884–1964) 
 Peale – Titian Peale (1799–1885)
 Pease – William Harper Pease (1824–1871)
 Pearson – Oliver Paynie Pearson (1915–2003)
 Pelzeln – August von Pelzeln (1825–1891)
 Pennant – Thomas Pennant (1726–1798)
 M. L. Penrith – Mary-Louise Penrith (born 1942)
 Perez-Moreno – Bernardino P. Pérez-Moreno
 Perle – Altangerel Perle (born 1945)
 Péron – François Péron (1775–1810)
 Perrier – Edmond Perrier (1844–1921)
 Perty – Joseph Anton Maximillian Perty (1804–1884) entomology
 Peters – Wilhelm Peters (1815–1883)
 D.S. Peters – Dieter Stefan Peters paleontology, including birds
 J.L. Peters – James Lee Peters (1889–1952) ornithology
 Petrunkevitch – Alexander Petrunkevitch (1875–1964)
 Pfeffer – Georg Johann Pfeffer (1854–1931)
 Philippi – Rodolfo Amando Philippi (1808–1904) paleontology, zoology
 Pic – Maurice Pic (1866–1957) entomology
 Pickard-Cambridge – Octavius Pickard-Cambridge (1828–1917)
 Pierce – Frank Nelson Pierce (1861–1943)
Pietsch – Theodore Wells Pietsch III
Pietschmann –  Victor Pietschmann (1881–1956)
 Pilsbry – Henry Augustus Pilsbry (1862–1957)
 Pisera – Andrzej Pisera
 Platnick – Norman I. Platnick arachnology
 Pocock – Reginald Innes Pocock (1863–1947)
 Poda – Nikolaus Poda von Neuhaus (1723–1798) entomology
 Poey – Felipe Poey (1799–1891) entomology, ichthyology
 Poeppig – Eduard Friedrich Poeppig (1798–1868)
 Pol – Diego Pol
 Poli – Giuseppe Saverio Poli (1746–1825)
 Pollini – Ciro Pollini (ru) (1782—1833)
 Pomel – Auguste Pomel (1821–1898)
 Pompeckj – Josef Felix Pompeckj (1867–1930)
 Pontoppidan – Erik Pontoppidan (1698–1764)
 Pope – Clifford Hillhouse Pope (1899–1974) herpetology
 Potts – Thomas Potts (1824–1888)
 Pouyaud – Laurent Pouyaud
 Powell – Jaime Eduardo Powell
 Pruvot-Fol – Alice Pruvot-Fol (1873–1972)
 Przewalski – Nikolai Przhevalsky (1839–1888)
 Pucheran – Jacques Pucheran (1817–1894)
 Pulitzer-Finali – Gustavo Pulitzer-Finali
 Püngeler – Rudolf Püngeler (1857–1927)
 Purcell – William Frederick Purcell (1866–1919)
 Pusch, von Pusch – Botho von Pusch

Q 

 Quatrefages – Jean Louis Armand de Quatrefages de Bréau (1810–1892)
 Quoy – Jean René Constant Quoy (1790–1869)

R 

 Raath – Michael Andrew Raath
 Rachmatika – Ike Rachmatika
 Rackett – Thomas Rackett (1757–1841)
 Radcliffe – Lewis Radcliffe (1880–1950)
 Radde – Gustav Radde (1831–1903)
 Rafinesque – Constantine Samuel Rafinesque-Schmaltz (1783–1840)
 Raffles – Thomas Stamford Raffles (1781–1826)
 Rainbow – William Joseph Rainbow (1856–1919)
 Rajasuriya – Arjan Rajasuriya
 Rambur – Jules Pièrre Rambur (1801–1870)
 Ramos – Robson Tamar da Costa Ramos
 Ramsay, E.P. Ramsay – Edward Pierson Ramsay (1842–1916)
 Rand – Austin L. Rand (1905–1982)
 Randall – John E. Randall (born 1924)
 Rathbun – Mary J. Rathbun (1860–1943)
 Rathke – Martin Heinrich Rathke (1793–1860)
 Ratzeburg – Julius Theodor Christian Ratzeburg (1801–1871)
 Rauhut – Oliver Walter Mischa Rauhut
 Razoumowsky – Grigory Razumovsky (1759–1837)
 Reakirt – Tryon Reakirt (1844–after 1871)
 Reboleira – Ana Sofia Reboleira (born 1980)
 Rebel – Hans Rebel (1861–1940)
 Regan – C. Tate Regan (1878–1943)
 Regel – Eduard August von Regel (1815–1892)
 Régimbart – Maurice Auguste Régimbart (1852–1907)
 Reichenbach – Ludwig Reichenbach (1793–1879)
 Reichenow – Anton Reichenow (1847–1941)
 Reid – Amanda Reid malacology
 Reig – Osvaldo Alfredo Reig (1929–1992)
 Reinhardt – Johannes Theodor Reinhardt (1816–1882)
 Reinhart – Roy Herbert Reinhart (1919–2005)
 Renyaan – Samuel J. Renyaan
 Retzius – Anders Jahan Retzius (1742–1821)
 Riabinin – Anatoly Nikolaevich Riabinin
 Rich – Thomas Hewitt Rich
 P. Rich – see Vickers-Rich
 Richardson – John Richardson (1787–1865)
 Richmond – Charles Wallace Richmond (1868–1932)
 Richmond – Neil D. Richmond (1912–1992) mammalogy, herpetology
 Ridgway – Robert Ridgway (1850–1929)
 Riggs – Elmer Samuel Riggs (1869–1963)
 Riley – Joseph Harvey Riley (1873–1941)
 Ripley – Sidney Dillon Ripley (1913–2001)
 Ris – Friedrich Ris (1867–1931)
 Risso – Antoine Risso (1777–1845)
 Rivero – Juan A. Rivero (fl. mid-late 20th century)
 Roberts – Austin Roberts (1883–1948)
 Robertson – David Ross Robertson (born 1946)
 Robinson – Herbert Christopher Robinson (1874–1929)
 Robison – Henry W. Robison
 Robson – Guy Coburn Robson (1888–1945)
 Rodriguez  – Gilberto Rodríguez (1929–2004)
 Röding  – Peter Friedrich Röding (1767–1846)
 Roewer – Carl Friedrich Roewer (1881–1963)
 Rogenhofer – Alois Friedrich Rogenhofer (1831–1897)
 Roger – Julius Roger (1819–1865)
 Rogick – Mary Dora Rogick (1906–1964) 
 Rohde – Klaus Rohde (born 1932)
 Rohwer – Sievert Allen Rohwer (1887–1951)
 Rondelet – Guillaume Rondelet (1507–1566)
 Roniewicz – Ewa Roniewicz
 Rossi – Pietro Rossi (1738–1804)
 Rossignol – Martial Rossignol
 Rossman – Douglas Athon Rossman (1936–2015)
 Rothschild – Walter Rothschild, 2nd Baron Rothschild (1868–1937)
 Roule – Louis Roule (1861–1942) 
 Roxas – Hilario Atanacio Roxas (1896–1926)
 Rozhdestvensky – Anatole Rozhdestvensky
 Rudolphi – Karl Rudolphi (1771–1832)
 Rüppell – Eduard Rüppell (1794–1884)
 Russell – Dale Alan Russell (1937–2019)
 Ryder – John Adam Ryder (1852–1895)

S 

 Sakamoto – Katsuichi Sakamoto
 Salgado – Leonardo Salgado
 Salmoni – Dave Salmoni
 Salter – John William Salter (1820–1869)
 Salvadori – Tommaso Salvadori (1835–1923)
 Salvin – Osbert Salvin (1835–1898)
 Samouelle – George Samouelle (c. 1790–1846)
 Sampson – Scott D. Sampson
 Sanborn – Colin Campbell Sanborn (1897–1962)
 Santschi – Felix Santschi (1872–1940)
 Sarato – Ligur Sarato
 G. O. Sars – Georg Ossian Sars (1837–1927)
 M. Sars – Michael Sars (1809–1869)
 Satunin – Konstantin Alexeevitsch Satunin (1863–1915)
 E. Saunders – Edward Saunders (1848–1910) entomology (mainly Coleoptera, Hemiptera, Hymenoptera)
 H. Saunders, Saunders – Howard Saunders (1835–1907) ornithology
 Saunders, W. Saunders – William Wilson Saunders (1809–1879) entomology (mainly Hymenoptera and Lepidoptera)
 Saussure – Henri Louis Frédéric de Saussure (1829–1905)
 Savi – Paolo Savi (1798–1871)
 Savigny – Marie Jules César Savigny (1777–1851)
 Saville-Kent – William Saville-Kent (1845–1908)
 Savornin – Justin Savornin (1876–1970)
 Say – Thomas Say (1787–1843)
 Schaum – Hermann Rudolph Schaum (1819–1865)
 Schinz – Heinrich Rudolf Schinz (1771–1861)
 Schiapelli – Rita Delia Schiapelli
 Schiffermüller – Ignaz Schiffermüller (1727–1806)
 Schiödte – Jørgen Matthias Christian Schiødte (1815–1884)
 Schlaikjer – Erich Maren Schlaikjer (1905–1972)
 Schlegel – Hermann Schlegel (1804–1884)
 Schmidt – Karl Patterson Schmidt (1890–1957)
 Schnabl – Johann Andreas Schnabl (1838–1912)
 Schneider – Johann Gottlob Schneider (1750–1822)
 Schoepf(f) – Johann David Schoepff (1752–1800)
 Schönherr – Carl Johan Schönherr (1772–1848)
 Schomburgk – Robert Hermann Schomburgk (1804–1865)
 Schrank – Franz Paula von Schrank (1747–1835)
 Schreber – Johann Christian Daniel von Schreber (1739–1810)
 Schren(c)k – Leopold von Schrenck (1824–1896)
 Schultz – Leonard Peter Schultz (1901–1986)
 Schwartz – Ernst Schwartz
 P. L. Sclater – Philip Sclater (1829–1913)
 W. L. Sclater – William Lutley Sclater (1863–1944)
 Scopoli – Giovanni Antonio Scopoli (1723–1788)
 Scott – John Scott (1823–1888)
 Scudder – Samuel Hubbard Scudder (1837–1911)
 Seebohm – Henry Seebohm (1832–1895)
 Seegers – Lothar Seegers
 Seeley – Harry Govier Seeley (1839–1909)
 Selby – Prideaux John Selby (1788–1867)
 Sélys – Edmond de Sélys Longchamps (1813–1900)
 Semenov-Tian-Shanskii – Andrei Semenov-Tian-Shanskii (1866–1942)
 Sennett – George B. Sennett (1840–1900)
 Sereno – Paul Sereno (born 1957)
 Serville – Jean Guillaume Audinet-Serville (1775–1858)
 Sevastianov – Aleksandr Fiodorovich Sevastianov
 Severtzov – Nikolai Alekseevich Severtzov (1827–1885)
 Sharpe – Richard Bowdler Sharpe (1847–1909)
 Shaw – George Shaw (1751–1813)
 Shelley – George Ernest Shelley (1840–1910)
 Shuckard – William Edward Shuckard (1803–1868)
 Sichel – Frédéric Jules Sichel (1802–1868)
 Sick – Helmut Sick (1910–1991)
 Sideleva – Valentina Grigorievna Sideleva
 Siebold – Karl Theodor Ernst von Siebold (1804–1885)
 Silvestri – Filippo Silvestri (1873–1949)
 Simon – Eugène Simon (1848–1924)
 Simpson – George Gaylord Simpson (1902–1984)
 Slipinski – Stanislaw Adam Ślipiński
 Slosson – Annie Trumbull Slosson (1838–1926) entomology
 Smith – Andrew Smith (1797–1872) zoology of southern Africa
 Hamilton Smith – Charles Hamilton Smith (1776–1859)
 E. Smith – Edgar Albert Smith (1847–1916) malacology
 F. Smith – Frederick Smith (1805–1879) entomology
 H.M. Smith – Hobart Muir Smith (1912–2013) herpetology
 J.E. Smith – James Edward Smith (1759–1828) Lepidoptera
 J.L.B. Smith – James Leonard Brierley Smith (1897–1968) ichthyology
 M.A. Smith – Malcolm Arthur Smith (1875–1958) herpetology
 S.I. Smith – Sidney Irving Smith (1843–1926) Crustacea
 W.L. Smith – William Leo Smith
 Snellen von Vollenhoven – Samuel Constantinus Snellen von Vollenhoven (1816–1880)
 Snethlage – Emilia Snethlage (1868–1929)
 Snodgrass – Robert Evans Snodgrass (1875–1962)
 Soeroto – Bambang Soeroto
 Sollas – William Johnson Sollas (1849–1936)
 Sowerby, Sby. – George Brettingham Sowerby I (1788–1854)
 Spallanzani – Lazzaro Spallanzani (1729–1799)
 Sparrman – Anders Sparrman (1781–1826)
 Spencer – Alison Louise (born 1993)
 Spencer – Walter Baldwin Spencer (1860–1929)
 Spinola – Maximilian Spinola (1780–1857)
 Spix – Johann Baptist von Spix (1781–1826)
 Stahnke – Herbert Ludwig Stahnke (1902–1990)
 Stainton – Henry Tibbats Stainton (1822–1892)
 Starks – Edwin Chapin Starks (1867–1932)
 Statius Müller/Muller – see P.L.S. Müller
 Staudinger – Otto Staudinger (1830–1900)
 Stebbing – Thomas Stebbing (1835–1926)
 Steenstrup – Japetus Steenstrup (1813–1897)
 Steere – Joseph Beal Steere (1842–1940)
 Stein – Johann Philip Emil Friedrich Stein (1816–1882)
 Steindachner – Franz Steindachner (1834–1919)
 Stejneger – Leonhard Hess Stejneger (1851–1943)
 Stephens – James Francis Stephens (1792–1852)
 Sternberg – Charles Hazelius Sternberg (1850–1943)
 Sternberg – Charles Mortram Sternberg (1885–1981)
 D. J. Stewart – Donald J. Stewart
 Stimpson – William Stimpson (1832–1872) naturalist, American
 Stirling – Edward Charles Stirling (1848–1919) anthropologist, Australian
 Stolzmann – Jean Stanislaus Stolzmann (1854–1928)
 Stoll – Caspar Stoll (died 1791)
 Storr – Gottlieb Conrad Christian Storr (1749–1821)
 Stovall – John Willis Stovall (1891–1953)
 Strand – Embrik Strand (1876–1953)
 Strauch – Alexander Strauch (1832–1893)
 Streets – Thomas Hale Streets (1847–1925)
 Stresemann – Erwin Stresemann (1889–1972)
 Strickland – Hugh Edwin Strickland (1811–1853)
 Stritt – Walter Stritt (1892–1975)
 Ström – Hans Ström (1726–1797)
 Stromer – Ernst Stromer (1870–1952)
 Struhsaker – Paul J. Struhsaker
 Su – Su Song (1020–1101)
 Such – George Such (1798–1879)
 Suckley – George Suckley (1830–1869)
 Sues – Hans-Dieter Sues (born 1956)
 Sullivan – Robert M. Sullivan
 Sulzer – Johann Heinrich Sulzer (1735–1813)
 Sundevall – Carl Jakob Sundevall (1801–1875)
 Swainson – William Swainson (1789–1855)
 Swann – Henry Kirke Swann (1871–1926)
 Swinhoe – Robert Swinhoe (1836–1877)
 Sykes – William Henry Sykes (1790–1872)

T 

 Tabachnick – Konstantin R. Tabachnick
 Taczanowski – Władysław Taczanowski (1819–1890)
 Talbot – Mignon Talbot (1869–1950)
 Taliev – Dmitrii Nikolaevich Taliev (1908–1952)
 Tang – Zhilu Tang
 Taquet – Philippe Taquet (born 1940)
 Taschenberg – Ernst Ludwig Taschenberg (1818–1898)
 Tate – George Henry Hamilton Tate (1894–1953)
 Tate – Ralph Tate (1840–1901)
 Tattersall, W.M. Tattersall – Walter Medley Tattersall (1882–1948)
 Taylor – Edward Harrison Taylor (1889–1978) herpetology, ichthyology
 L.R. Taylor – Leighton R. Taylor
 Temminck – Coenraad Jacob Temminck (1778–1858)
 Templeton – Robert Templeton (1802–1892)
 Thayer – John Eliot Thayer (1862–1933)
 Théel – Johan Hjalmar Théel (1848–1937)
 Theischinger – Günther Theischinger (born 1940)
 Theobald, W. Theob. – William Theobald (1829–1908)
 Thiele – Johannes Thiele (1860–1935)
 Thomas – Oldfield Thomas (1858–1929)
 Thomson, J. Thomson – James Thomson (1828–1897) entomology, primarily Coleoptera and Hymenoptera
 C.G. Thomson, Thomson – Carl Gustaf Thomson (1824–1899) entomology, primarily Swedish insects
 Thorell – Tord Tamerlan Teodor Thorell (1830–1901)
 Thunberg – Carl Peter Thunberg (1743–1828)
 Tillyard – Robert John Tillyard (1881–1937)
 Timm – Tarmo Timm (born 1936)
 Tinbergen – Nikolaas Tinbergen (1907–1988)
 Tjakrawidjaja – Agus Tjakrawidjaja
 Ticehurst – Claud Buchanan Ticehurst (1881–1941)
 Tidwell – Virginia Tidwell
 Tilesius – Wilhelm Gottlieb Tilesius von Tilenau (1769–1857)
 Timberlake – Philip H. Timberlake (1883–1981)
 Tischbein – Peter Friedrich Ludwig Tischbein (1813–1883)
 Todd – Walter Edmond Clyde Todd (1874–1969)
 Tokioka – Takasi Tokioka (1913–2001)
 Toledo-Piza – Mônica de Toledo-Piza Ragazzo
 Tomes – Robert Fisher Tomes (1823–1904)
 Townsend – John Kirk Townsend (1809–1851) ornithology, mainly landbirds
 C. H. Townsend – Charles Haskins Townsend (1859–1944) marine biology
 Toxopeus – Lambertus Johannes Toxopeus (1894–1951) entomology
 Traill – Thomas Stewart Traill (1781–1862)
 Traylor – Melvin Alvah Traylor Jr. (1915–2008)
 Trewavas – Ethelwynn Trewavas (1900–1993)
 Tristram – Henry Baker Tristram (1822–1906)
 Troschel – Franz Hermann Troschel (1810–1882)
 Trouessart – Édouard Louis Trouessart (1842–1927)
 True – Frederick W. True (1858–1914)
 Trybom – Filip Trybom (1850–1913)
 Tryon – George Washington Tryon (1838–1888) malacology
 Tschudi – Johann Jakob von Tschudi (1818–1889)
 Tsogtbaatar – Khishigjaw Tsogtbaatar
 Tumanova – Tat'yana Alekseyevna Tumanova
 Tunstall – Marmaduke Tunstall (1743–1790)
 Turner – Alfred Jefferis Turner (1861–1947)
 Turton – William Turton (1762–1835)
 Tutt – J. W. Tutt (1858–1911)
 Tytler – Robert Christopher Tytler (1818–1872)

U 

 Uhler – Philip Reese Uhler (1835–1913)

V 

 Vaillant – Léon Vaillant (1834–1914)
 Valenciennes – Achille Valenciennes (1794–1865)
 Van Denburgh – John Van Denburgh (1872–1924)
 Van Duzee, E.P. Van Duzee – Edward Payson Van Duzee (1861–1940)
 Van Duzee, M.C. Van Duzee – Millard Carr Van Duzee (1860–1934)
 Vander Linden – Pierre Léonard Vander Linden (1797–1831)
 Varricchio – David J. Varricchio
 E. Verreaux – Edouard Verreaux (1810–1868)
 J. Verreaux – Jules Verreaux (1807–1873)
 Verrill – Addison Emery Verrill (1839–1926)
 Vickaryous – Matthew P. Vickaryous
 Vickers-Rich, P. Rich – Patricia Vickers-Rich (born 1944)
 Vieillot – Louis Jean Pierre Vieillot (1748–1831)
 Vieweg – C. F. Vieweg
 Vigors – Nicholas Aylward Vigors (1785–1840)
 Villers – Charles Joseph de Villers (1724–1810)
 Vladykov – Vadim Dmitrij Vladykov (1898–1986)
 von Blomberg – Ernst Freiherr von Blomberg (1821–1903)

W 

 Wagler – Johann Georg Wagler (1800–1832)
 Wagner – Johann Andreas Wagner (1797–1861)
 Wahlberg – Johan August Wahlberg (1810–1859)
 Walbaum – Johann Julius Walbaum (1724–1799)
 Walch – Johann Ernst Immanuel Walch (1725–1778)
 Walckenaer – Charles Athanase Walckenaer (1771–1852)
 Walker – Edmund Murton Walker (1877–1969) entomology
 A. Walker – Alick Donald Walker (1925–1999) paleontology
 C.A. Walker – Cyril Alexander Walker paleontology
 F. Walker – Francis Walker (1809–1874) entomology
 Wall – Frank Wall (1868–1950)
 Wallace – Alfred Russel Wallace (1823–1913)
 Wallengren – Hans Daniel Johan Wallengren (1823–1894)
 Walsh – Benjamin Dann Walsh (1808–1869)
 Walsingham – Thomas de Grey, 6th Baron Walsingham (1843–1919)
 Waltl – Joseph Waltl (1805–1888)
 X.L. Wang, X.-L. Wang, X. Wang – Xiaolin Wang (zoologist)
 Y.Q. Wang, Y.-Q. Wang, Y. Wang – Yuanqing Wang
 R.G. Wardlaw-Ramsay – Robert George Wardlaw Ramsay (1852–1921)
 Watabe – Mahito Watabe
 Waterhouse – George Robert Waterhouse (1801–1888)
 Watson – James D. Watson (born 1928)
 R. Watson – Ronald E. Watson
 Weber – Max Carl Wilhelm Weber (1852–1937) general zoology, mainly vertebrates
 H. Weber, Weber – Hermann Weber (1899–1956)
 Wegrzynowicz – Piotr Węgrzynowicz
 Weigold – Hugo Weigold (1886–1973)
 Weishampel – David B. Weishampel (born 1952)
 Welles – Samuel Paul Welles (1907–1997)
 West – Rick C. West arachnology
 Westwood – John O. Westwood (1805–1893)
 Wetmore – Alexander Wetmore (1886–1978)
 Weyenbergh – Hendrik Weyenbergh, Jr. (1842–1885)
 Wheeler – William Morton Wheeler (1865–1937)
 Whitaker – Joseph Whitaker ornithology
 White – Adam White (1817–1878)
 Whitley – Gilbert Percy Whitley (1903–1975)
 Wiedemann – Christian Rudolph Wilhelm Wiedemann (1770–1840)
 Wied-Neuwied – Maximilian zu Wied-Neuwied (1782–1867)
 Wiegmann – Arend Friedrich August Wiegmann (1802–1841)
 Williams – James David Williams (1941–2021)
 Williamson – Thomas Edward Williamson
 Wilsmore – Leonora Jessie Wilsmore (1865–1945)
 Wilson – Alexander Wilson (1766–1813) ornithology
 E.O. Wilson – Edward Osborne Wilson (1929–2021)
 J.A. Wilson – Jeffrey A. Wilson paleontology
 Wiman – Carl Wiman (1867–1944)
 Wingate – David B. Wingate (born 1935)
 Winge – Herluf Winge (1857–1923)
 Wirjoatmodjo – Soetikno Wirjoatmodjo
 Wolfe – Douglas Gerald Wolfe
 Wood, W. Wood – William Wood (1774–1857) entomology
 C.T. Wood, Wood – Charles Thorold Wood (1777–1852) ornithology
 Wood-Mason – James Wood-Mason (1846–1893)
 Woodhouse – Samuel Washington Woodhouse (1821–1904)
 Woodward – Arthur Smith Woodward (1864–1944)
 Wroughton – R. C. Wroughton (1849–1921)

X 

 Xantus – John Xantus de Vesey (1825–1894)
 Xu – Xing Xu

Y 

 Yamaguchi, Yamaguti – Masao Yamaguchi
 Yamaguti Satyu Yamaguti (1894–1976) parasitology
 Yamanoue – Yusuke Yamanoue
 Yang, Young – Zhongjian Yang (1897–1979)
 Yarrell – William Yarrell (1784–1856)
 Yoseda – Kenzo Yoseda
 You – Heilu Go Pak You
 Young – David Allan Young (1915–1991) Hemiptera, especially Cicadellidae

Z 

 Zaddach – Ernst Gustav Zaddach (1817–1881)
 Zagulajev, Zagulayev – Aleksei Konstantinovich Zagulajev (1924–2007)
 Zanno – Lindsay E. Zanno
 Zeledon – José Castulo Zeledón (1846–1923)
 Zeller – Philipp Christoph Zeller (1808–1883)
 Zetterstedt – Johan Wilhelm Zetterstedt (1785–1874)
 B./B.K./B.-K. Zhang – Bao-kun Zhang
 F./F.C./F.-C. Zhang – Fucheng Zhang
 Zhao – Xijin Zhao
 S. Zhou – Shiwu Zhou (born 1940)
 Z./Z.H.Z.-H. Zhou – Zhonghe Zhou (born 1965)
 Zimmer – John Todd Zimmer (1889–1957)
 Zimmermann – Eberhard August Wilhelm von Zimmermann (1743–1815)
 Zincken – Johann Leopold Theodor Friedrich Zincken (1770–1856)
 Zirngiebl – Lothar Zirngiebl (1902–1973)
 Zittel – Karl Alfred von Zittel (1839–1904)
 Zur Strassen – Otto zur Strassen (1869–1961)

See also
 List of botanists by author abbreviation
 List of biologists
 List of Russian zoologists

External links 
 Scarab Workers World Directory
 World Diptera Systematists Home Page
 Zoonomen (Ornithologie)
 www.natuurcijfers.nl/namen/auteursnamen.htm
 Biographical Etymology of Marine Organism Names

 
Zoologists by author abbreviation
Zoologists